The 2017–18 Wright State Raiders men's basketball team represented Wright State University during the 2017–18 NCAA Division I men's basketball season. The Raiders, led by second-year head coach Scott Nagy, played their home games at the Nutter Center in Fairborn, Ohio, as members of the Horizon League. They finished the season 25–10, 14–4 in Horizon League play to finish in second place. In the Horizon League tournament, they defeated Green Bay, Milwaukee, and Cleveland State to become Horizon League Tournament champions. This received the Horizon League's automatic bid to the NCAA tournament, where they lost to Tennessee in the first round.

Previous season
The Raiders finished the 2016–17 season 20–12, 11–7 in Horizon League play to finish fifth place. In the Horizon League tournament, they lost to Northern Kentucky in the quarterfinals. Despite having 20 wins, they did not participate in a postseason tournament.

Offseason

Departures

Incoming transfers

Recruiting class of 2017

Recruiting class of 2018

Roster

Schedule and results

|-
! colspan="9" style=| Exhibition

|-
! colspan="9" style=| Non-Conference regular season

|-
! colspan="9" style=| Horizon League regular season

|-
! colspan="9" style=|Horizon League tournament

|-
! colspan="9" style=|NCAA tournament

References

Wright State Raiders men's basketball seasons
Wright State
Wright State Raiders men's b
Wright State Raiders men's b
Wright State